Vedado Historic District is a national historic district in West Palm Beach, Florida in Palm Beach County. Including primarily one-story buildings constructed between 1947 and 1957 as well as the Land Boom from 1924 to 1928, it is bounded by Merril Ave, Southern Blvd, Parker Ave, and Paseo Morella.

It was added to the National Register of Historic Places in 2010.

References

National Register of Historic Places in Palm Beach County, Florida
Historic districts on the National Register of Historic Places in Florida
Historic districts in Palm Beach County, Florida